More Than This is an Australian streaming television drama series that was released on Paramount+ on 4 March 2022. The series was written by teen actor Olivia Deeble and co-created with Luka Gracie both of whom also star in this series.

Premise
The series explores issues facing Australian teenagers, including bullying, body image, relationships and sexuality.

Cast
 Olivia Deeble as Charlotte 
 Bert Labonte as Mr E
 Luka Gracie as Jamie
 Kamil Ellis as Alexander
 Ellmir Asipi as Leon
 Josh Heuston as Sammy
 Oisin O’Leary as Benson
 Celine Ajobong as Legs (Alegra)
 Tharanya Tharan as Emma
 Selena Brincat as Zali

Episodes

References

External links
 

2022 Australian television series debuts
2022 Australian television series endings
2020s Australian comedy television series
English-language television shows
Paramount+ original programming
Television series about teenagers
Television series by ITV Studios